Seatrain may refer to:

 Seatrain Lines, a defunct U.S. shipping company
 Seatrain shipbuilding, a shipbuilding subsidiary of Seatrain Lines
 Seatrain (band), a late 1960s – early 1970s roots-fusion band
 Sea Train (album), a 1969 album by the band Seatrain
 Seatrain (album), a 1970 album by the band Seatrain
 Seatrain (horse), winner of the 1975 Little Brown Jug horse race
 Sea Train, a type of conveyance in the One Piece manga

See also
 C-Train, a light rail transit system in Calgary, Canada